"Adicto" is a song by Puerto Rican musicians Tainy, Anuel AA and Ozuna, released through Rimas on August 22, 2019. 

Tainy's first song as lead producer, "Adicto" peaked at number 86 on the US Billboard Hot 100 and received a platinum certification in Spain.

Charts

Weekly charts

Year-end charts

Certifications

See also
 List of Billboard Argentina Hot 100 top-ten singles in 2019

References

2019 singles
2019 songs
Tainy songs
Anuel AA songs
Ozuna (singer) songs
Song recordings produced by Tainy
Songs written by Tainy
Spanish-language songs